The Single Sin is a 1931 American Pre-code drama film directed by William Nigh and starring Kay Johnson, Bert Lytell and Paul Hurst. It was produced and released by the independent company Tiffany Pictures.

Synopsis
Struggling actress Kate Adams gets mixed up in a bootlegging racket, but is sent to jail for several months. Reforming herself she gets a job as the secretary of millionaire Roger Van Dorn, who eventually marries her. Her newfound respectability is threatened when her former partner in crime Frank Bowman is released from prison and gets a job as Van Dorn's chauffeur. He proceeds to blackmail Kate by threatening to reveal their former association.

Cast
Kay Johnson as Kate Adams
Bert Lytell as Joe Strickland
Paul Hurst as Slug
Matthew Betz as Frank Bowman
Holmes Herbert as Roger Van Dorn
Geneva Mitchell as Marian
Sandra Ravel as French maid
Charles McNaughton as Butler
Lillian Elliott as Cook
Robert Emmett O'Connor as Detective

Preservation status
A print is held at the Library of Congress.

References

External links
 
 

1931 films
Tiffany Pictures films
Films directed by William Nigh
1931 drama films
American black-and-white films
American drama films
1930s American films